

July 2012

August 2012

Out of window transfers

Extended window for Grosseto, Lecce & Vicenza

References

Transfers
Italian
2012